Anacampseros filamentosa is a species of succulent plant native to the Karoo region of South Africa.

Description

This plant forms clusters of tiny stems, each covered in densely-packed, round leaves. 

Each leaf is almost a sphere in shape, but has a tiny, down-turned "chin" at its tip. The leaves, and the entire plant, are covered in a dense coat of hair, giving it a white colour. Additionally, a few longer, bristly hairs extend further out (though in the northern part of its range, the namaquensis subspecies has shorter bristles that do not extend further than the leaves). 

The flowers are pink.

References

filamentosa